The  Cleveland Gladiators season was the 16th season for the franchise in the Arena Football League, and their sixth while in Cleveland. The team was coached by Steve Thonn and played their home games at Quicken Loans Arena. The Gladiators finished with an 8-10 record after going the previous year 17-1, but qualified for the playoffs again.

Standings

Schedule

Regular season
The 2015 regular season schedule was released on December 19, 2014.

Playoffs

Roster

References

Cleveland Gladiators
Cleveland Gladiators seasons
Cleveland Gladiators